Coke Zoo is a collaborative mixtape by American hip hop recording artists French Montana and Fetty Wap. The mixtape was announced in early October and released on October 26, 2015 by Coke Boys, RGF, Maybach Music Group and 300 Entertainment. It features guest appearances from Chris Brown, Puff Daddy, Zoo Gang associates Monty and Nitt Da Gritt, and Coke Boy associates Lil Durk and Zack. Production derives from AK47, Bassivity, Eye Beat, Metro Boomin, Mike DZL, Mixx, NickEBeats, Peoples, Remo The Hitmaker, RGF Productions, The MeKanics and Yung Lan.

Background 
On October 9, French Montana's brother Cokeboy Zack appeared on Revolt TV announcing the release of the mixtape Coke Zoo, a collaboration between French Montana and Fetty Wap. On October 12, actress Sanaa Lathan, rumored to be dating French at the time, uploaded an early version of the mixtape cover on her Instagram, further confirming the upcoming release.

The two rappers had recently accompanied Chris Brown on his nationwide "One Hell of a Nite Tour", alongside the likes of Migos, Omarion and August Alsina. During which, the two had recorded eight tracks together which culminated in the Coke Zoo mixtape, a play on French's "Coke Boys" and Fetty's "Zoo Gang" rap collectives, respectively. The record features five collaboration tracks between French Montana and Fetty Wap, in addition to two tracks from Fetty Wap, and another five tracks from French Montana.

Critical reception 
Coke Zoo received average reviews from music critics. Sheldon Pearce of Pitchfork praised the chemistry between the two rappers but felt that "Many of the ideas and sounds on Coke Zoo feel like Fetty Wap B-sides and leftovers."

Track listing

References

External links 

Music videos
 First Time
 Freaky
 Last Of The Real Ones

2015 mixtape albums
French Montana albums
Collaborative albums
Albums produced by Metro Boomin